Sportsplassen ("The Sports Field") is a multi-use stadium in Nordstrand, Oslo, Norway. It is currently used mostly for track and field meets and football matches, both under the auspices of Bækkelagets SK.

The 400-metre athletics track was inaugurated in 2012.

It is served by the station Sportsplassen on the Oslo Tramway.

References

Football venues in Norway
Athletics (track and field) venues in Norway
Sports venues in Oslo